The men's parallel bars competition at the 1952 Summer Olympics was held at Messuhalli, Exhibition Hall I from 19 to 21 July. It was the eighth appearance of the event. There were 185 competitors from 29 nations, with each nation sending up to 8 gymnasts. The event was won by Hans Eugster of Switzerland, the nation's second consecutive and third overall victory in the parallel bars, breaking a tie with Germany for most all-time. Switzerland also took bronze, as Josef Stalder repeated his 1948 third-place performance (making him the second man to win multiple medals in the event, after fellow Swiss Michael Reusch). The Soviet Union's debut resulted in a silver medal for Viktor Chukarin, who would become the third multi-medalist in 1956.

Background

This was the eighth appearance of the event, which is one of the five apparatus events held every time there were apparatus events at the Summer Olympics (no apparatus events were held in 1900, 1908, 1912, or 1920). Six of the top 10 gymnasts from 1948 returned: bronze medalist Josef Stalder of Switzerland, sixth-place finisher Heikki Savolainen of Finland, seventh-place finishers Paavo Aaltonen of Finland and Zdeněk Růžička of Czechoslovakia, ninth-place finisher Lajos Sántha of Hungary, and tenth-place finisher Olavi Rove of Finland. Swiss gymnast Hans Eugster was the reigning (1950) world champion, with Rove the runner-up.

Belgium, India, Norway, Poland, Portugal, Saar, South Africa, the Soviet Union, Spain, and Sweden each made their debut in the men's parallel bars. The United States made its seventh appearance, most of any nation, having missed only the inaugural 1896 Games. Of the 22 different nations that had competed at least once in the event before 1952, 19 competed in Helsinki (only Greece, Mexico, and the Netherlands were missing among the nations having previously competed).

Competition format

The gymnastics format continued to use the aggregation format. Each nation entered a team of between five and eight gymnasts or up to three individual gymnasts. All entrants in the gymnastics competitions performed both a compulsory exercise and a voluntary exercise for each apparatus. The 2 exercise scores were summed to give a total for the apparatus.

No separate finals were contested.

For each exercise, four judges gave scores from 0 to 10 in one-tenth point increments. The top and bottom scores were discarded and the remaining two scores averaged to give the exercise total. Thus, exercise scores ranged from 0 to 10 and apparatus scores from 0 to 20.

The competitor had the option to make a second try only on the compulsory exercise—with the second attempt counting regardless of whether it was better than the first.

Schedule

All times are Eastern European Summer Time (UTC+3)

Results

References

Men's parallel bars
1952
Men's 1952
Men's events at the 1952 Summer Olympics